Daniel Kraus (born 11 May 1984 in Leipzig) is a German former footballer and current head coach of SC Freiburg (women).

Coaching career
Kraus holds coaching licence C and began as goalkeeper coach for FF USV Jena in July 2010.

References

1984 births
Living people
German footballers
FC Carl Zeiss Jena players
Association football goalkeepers
German football managers
Footballers from Leipzig
2. Bundesliga players
3. Liga players